Eighteen Epigrams are attributed to Plato, most of them considered spurious. These are short poems suitable for dedicatory purposes written in the form of elegiac couplets.

People, places and pantheon

Typically of ancient Greek literature (and regardless of their Platonic authenticity), the Epigrams clearly refer to historical personalities, various places in and around ancient Greece, and specific characters of Greek mythology.

People

 Hecuba: queen of Troy.  The Trojan loss of the Trojan war, as described in the Iliad, explains the decree of tears for Hecuba and the women of Troy at the hands of the Fates, who represent the harsher inevitabilities of the human condition, such as death and destiny.
 Dion: the political figure of Syracuse whose campaign is discussed at length in the Platonic Epistles, or Letters.
 Alexis: possibly one of a number of already-named ancient personalities, or else a new personality of the same name altogether.
 Phaedrus: Plato's contemporary; namesake of the Platonic dialogue of the same name.
 Archeanassa: a possible historical romantic interest of Plato's.
 Agathon: Athenian tragic poet, known for appearing in Plato's Symposium.
 Xanthippe: Socrates' wife.  The pertinent epigram may therefore represent Socrates' courtship of Xanthippe.
 Laïs: A reference to either of the courtesans Lais of Corinth or Lais of Hyccara, the two being historically confused in ancient literature, and therefore inextricably linked.
 Pindar: lyric poet, whose association with the muses is a compliment of his skill.
 Sappho: female lyric poet, whose skill is likewise complimented by counting her as a tenth muse, a common appellation for Sappho in the ancient historical record.
 Praxiteles: sculptor.  The epigram is a poetic compliment of his skill, as in its telling, the (later often-copied) Aphrodite of Knidos is beheld by Aphrodite herself, and is judged by her to be a perfect likeness.
 Aristophanes: comic playwright.  As the Graces represent the happier elements of the human condition, it is fitting that they would be associated with Aristophanes in epigram 18.

Places
Well-known place names mentioned in the Epigrams include Troy, Greece itself, the Aegean Sea, and Athens.  More specific references include:
 Colophon: a city of ancient Greece, present day western Turkey.
 Euboea: a large island in central Greece, just off the mainland, near Athens.
 Eretria: a city in Euboea.
 Susa: a city of ancient Persia, present day western Iran.
 Ecbatana: another city of ancient Persia, present day western Iran.
 Lesbos: an island in Eastern Greece, near present-day Turkey, historical home of Sappho.
 Cnidus (Knidos), then a Greek city in present-day southwestern Turkey, site of the aforementioned Aphrodite of Knidos sculpture.

Mythological figures
 The Fates: in their capacity for terrible assignment of destiny to humans, the Fates are mentioned as decreeing tears to Trojan women.
 The Muses: mentioned twice, the Muses are associated with the creative efforts of Pindar and Sappho.
 The Graces: representing the happier elements of the human condition, the Graces are associated with Aristophanes.
 "The Paphian" and "Cypris": both names refer to the goddess Aphrodite who, according to legend, rose from the sea at Paphos, southwestern Cyprus.  The first "Cypris" of epigram 17 therefore refers to the goddess herself, while the second "Cypris" refers to the famous, lost (though often-copied) statue of her likeness, the Aphrodite of Knidos, which Aphrodite is acknowledging as a perfect likeness.

References

External links

Works by Plato